Büste is a village and a former municipality in the district of Stendal, in Saxony-Anhalt, Germany. It has been a part of the town Bismark since 1 January 2010.

Former municipalities in Saxony-Anhalt
Bismark, Germany